The National Civil Aviation Administration, otherwise known by its local initialism ANAC, is the civil aviation authority of Argentina. It was created by a presidential decree on 15 March 2007 to succeed the Argentine Air Force in its functions, overseeing all aspects of civil aviation within the Argentine territory. The body is divided into five Directorates, as well as several operative dependencies. It has its headquarters in Buenos Aires.

See also

International Civil Aviation Organization
List of civil aviation authorities

References

External links
 

Government of Argentina
Argentina
Civil aviation in Argentina
Transport organisations based in Argentina